Alexis Beucler is an American artistic gymnast from Findlay, Ohio. She was an elite gymnast in 2012 but has since moved down to Level 10.

Alexis, or "Poof" as she's known by many people, has trained at Cincinnati Gymnastics most of her life and she was coached by Mary Lee Tracy. She announced her move via Twitter and has been training there since May 2013. After making it to the Elite level in Texas last year, she then later went on to compete at American and Secret U.S Classic competitions placing 4th and 18th in both. In St Louis, Missouri, she competed with teammates Lexie Priessman, Amelia Hundley at the U.S Gymnastics Championships where she placed 13th.

Beucler moved to Brandy Johnson's Global Gymnastics in Summer of 2013 but hasn't been allowed to compete elite since her former coach, Mary Lee Tracy sent a petition to USA Gymnastics requesting her elite status be revoked. She will now wait to re-qualify

As of July 16, 2015, she is committed to North Carolina State University.

References

External links
 https://web.archive.org/web/20130512012637/http://www.gym-style.com/alexis/
 http://usagym.org/pages/athletes/athleteListDetail.html?id=178534

1997 births
Living people
American female artistic gymnasts
People from Findlay, Ohio
Sportspeople from Ohio
Level 10 gymnasts
21st-century American women